Eurytoma tylodermatis is a species of chalcid wasp in the family Eurytomidae. It is a generalist parasite with over 56 host species.

References

Further reading

 
 
 

Eurytomidae
Insects described in 1896